Stefan Gress is a German plastic and reconstructive surgeon. He is best known for his contributions to composite reduction labiaplasty and has published various notable works within the field of labiaplasty.

Career
Prof. Dr. Stefan Gress studied plastic surgery with Ivo Pitanguy in Rio de Janeiro, where he also practiced plastic surgery. He also attended Ludwig Maximilian University of Munich, Technical University of Munich, Universidade Federal da Bahia, and New York University School of Medicine where he specialized in aesthetic surgery particularly concerning breast, face, and female genital area.

Dr Gress has published various works concerning composite reduction labiaplasty where he helped develop methodologies for treating areas concerning internal and external labium minus, dissection of the cranial pedicle flap, and the labia minora area.

Publications

 Rundschau. Publication: Ästhetische und funktionelle Korrekturen im weiblichen Genitalbereich: 47: 23–32 (2007).
 Die Optimierung Der Genitalregion. Publication: Operationsmethoden, Komplikationen und Patientenzufriedenheit: Edition 2, Page 11 (2010)
 Ästhetische Chirurgie. Publication: Form- und funktionsverbessernde Eingriffe im weiblichen Genitalbereich (April, 2011).
 Aesthetic Plastic Surgery. Publication: Composite Reduction Labiaplasty. Edition  No. 4 (2013/37).
 Jahrestagung Der Deutschen Gesellschaft Fur Plastische Und Wiederherstellungschirurgie E.V.  Düsseldorf (October, 2015)
 Kongress: F.A.C.E 2 face. Cannes / France Presidency: Prof. Gress Labia Minoraplasty and Majoraplast (September, 2016).

References

External links
 Labia Reduction Costs & Techniques Prof. Gress Munich

Living people
German plastic surgeons
German medical researchers
Year of birth missing (living people)